Michelle Ruff is an American voice actress known for her work in anime and video games. In her early voice acting career, she used her mother's name, Georgette Rose, as a pseudonym. Some of her roles include Fujiko Mine in Lupin the Third, Chi in Chobits, Rukia Kuchiki in Bleach, Aoi Sakuraba in Ai Yori Aoshi, Elie in Rave Master, Nat in The Promised Neverland, Yuki Nagato in The Melancholy of Haruhi Suzumiya, Yoko Littner in Gurren Lagann, and Sinon in Sword Art Online. In video games, she is the voice of Jill Valentine in the Resident Evil series, Yukari Takeba and Sadayo Kawakami in the Persona series, Cream the Rabbit in the Sonic the Hedgehog series and Crimson Viper in the Street Fighter series.

Career
Ruff grew up in Michigan and graduated from Michigan State University. While she was there, she worked at a talent agency and attended a radio audition, which marked her first venture into the voiceover business. In Chicago, she studied with Second City, Players Workshop and Improv Olympic.

After moving to Los Angeles, she worked with some directors on looping and voice work for films and TV shows. In an Anime Dream interview, Ruff credits Richard Epcar, Steve Kramer and Michael Sorich for training her to dub anime. In the Digimon series, she was referred by director Mary Elizabeth McGlynn to audition for Lopmon and Antylamon in Digimon Tamers, and in Digimon Frontier, she landed the lead role of Zoe Orimoto. Ruff said that it was her first show that made it to TV, and a show that let her "work my acting muscle". She played tomboy-ish characters Miyao in Carried by the Wind: Tsukikage Ran and Kiki Rosita in Mobile Suit Gundam: The 08th MS Team.

In 2007, Ruff received two nominations for the American Anime Awards, one for Best Actress for her work in Bleach and Lupin the 3rd, and one for Best Actress in a Comedy for Lupin the 3rd, but lost to Mary Elizabeth McGlynn and Debi Derryberry, respectively. In 2009, the Society for the Promotion of Japanese Animation gave her an SPJA Industry Award for Best Voice Actress (English) for her work as Rukia Kuchiki in the Bleach movie Memories of Nobody.

Personal life 
Ruff is married to ADR Engineer Eddie Correa.

Filmography

Anime

Animation

Films

Video games

Other

Notes

References

External links
 
 
 
 Michelle Ruff at the CrystalAcids Anime Voice Actor Database
 

Year of birth missing (living people)
Place of birth missing (living people)
Actresses from Detroit
American video game actresses
American voice actresses
Living people
Michigan State University alumni
20th-century American actresses
21st-century American actresses
Actresses from Los Angeles